The 2010 Ulster Senior Hurling Championship was the 65th  installment of the annual Ulster Senior Hurling Championship held under the auspices of the Ulster GAA. Antrim were the defending champions and successfully claimed their ninth consecutive title, beating  finalists Down.

Format

The draw for the Ulster championship was seeded, and took place in a staggered single elimination format. Antrim received a bye to the final, Down and Derry to the quarteri-final and London to the second round. All six other teams entered in the first round.

There was no entry from the Ulster Championship to the 2010 All-Ireland Senior Hurling Championship proper. Antrim instead entered that competition through the preliminary round of the Leinster Senior Hurling Championship.

The other Ulster teams were not eligible, and took part in lower tier competitions, such as the 2010 Christy Ring Cup, the second tier All-Ireland hurling championship.

The number of teams in the championship for 2010, as in 2008 and 2009, was ten.

In order to avoid mismatches, the draw was set in set so that the weaker counties were not faced with the prospect of facing regional powers Antrim at an early stage; instead all the other counties took part in a series of elimination matches for the right to meet Antrim in the final.

Controversy

In the semifinal, London were expected to play Down for the right to face Antrim in the final. However, a class of fixtures occurred with London participating in the Nicky Rackard Cup, the third tier All-Ireland Senior Hurling Championship competition.

As Ulster GAA refused to re-organise the fixture, London forfeited the tie by walkover to Down; shortly thereafter, London GAA signalled their intention to leave the Ulster Senior Hurling Championship from 2011.

Teams

Bracket

References

External links
Ulster GAA website

Ulster Hurling Senior
Hurling
Ulster Senior Hurling Championship